Frenchmans Bluff is a summit in Norman County, Minnesota, in the United States.

Frenchmans Bluff was so named on account of early pioneers finding abandoned log cabins they believed to have been built by French fur traders.

References

External links
 Frenchman's Bluff Scientific and Natural Area–Minnesota Department of Natural Resources
 Frenchman's Bluff Scientific and Natural Area–The Nature Conservancy

Landforms of Norman County, Minnesota
Mountains of Minnesota